The Ramstor Bridge (officially called Ramstor Arch Bridge) is an Arch bridge spanning the Ishim River in Nur-Sultan, Kazakhstan. It was built between 2007 and 2008 as a road bridge crossing the Ishim River.

Accidents and incidents
 23 July 2014: two young couples climbed on top of the arch to be photographed. The police removed the couples from the bridge and were then sued. 
 28 March 2016: a 39-year-old resident jumped off from the bridge in a suicide attempt. The victim died without regaining consciousness.
 11 June 2016: three 15-year-old boys climbed on top to the arch for an attempt to make a selfie. The police escorted the boys and were taken to the police division.
 18 July 2016: at about 8:00 am, a drunk 24-year-old male climbed on top of the arch. According to the police, the person was moderately intoxicated.

Gallery

References

Bridges in Astana
Arch bridges in Kazakhstan
Through arch bridges
Bridges completed in 2008
Road bridges in Kazakhstan
2008 establishments in Kazakhstan